Mary Rorke (14 February 1858, in London – 12 October 1938, in London) was a British stage and film actress.

Select filmography
 Caste (1915)
 The Marriage of William Ashe (1916)
 Dr. Wake's Patient (1916)
 The Second Mrs Tanqueray (1916)
 Tinker, Tailor, Soldier, Sailor (1918)
 The Right Element (1919)
 The Bridal Chair (1919)
 Testimony (1920)
 Unmarried (1920)
 Pillars of Society (1920)
 Boy Woodburn (1922)
 The Starlit Garden (1923)
 M'Lord of the White Road (1923)
 The Harbour Lights (1923)
 Thou Fool (1926)
 For Valour (1928)
 Reckless Decision (1933)

References

External links

1858 births
1938 deaths
English stage actresses
English film actresses
English silent film actresses
Actresses from London
19th-century English actresses
20th-century English actresses